Attorney General Pryor may refer to:

Mark Pryor (born 1963), Attorney General of Arkansas
William H. Pryor Jr. (born 1962), Attorney General of Alabama